Madi Phala (2 February 1955 – 2 March 2007) was a South African artist. His later works were predominantly painting and collage and dealt with the theme of the African herd boy.

Biography
Phala was born 2 February 1955 in Kwa-Thema, Springs, South Africa.

Phala's work is represented in several private and corporate art collections, including the French Embassy; De Beers, London, as well as Minister Pallo Jordan and art historian Barbara Lindop.  His sculpture SS Mendi Memorial, commemorating the sinking of troopship Mendi in 1917, was designated a national heritage site in 2016.

He was murdered outside his house at Langa, Cape Town on 2 March 2007 during a robbery.

References

External links
 Recent exhibitions
 Extensive biography
 Barbara Lindop
 "Who is Madi Phala?", Sunday Times Heritage Project.

1955 births
2007 deaths
South African artists
South African murder victims
People murdered in South Africa
People from Springs, Gauteng